The 2012 NCAA Division I Men's Swimming and Diving Championships were contested in March 2012 at the Weyerhaeuser Aquatic Center in Federal Way, Washington at the 89th annual NCAA-sanctioned swim meet to determine the team and individual national champions of Division I men's collegiate swimming and diving in the United States.

California again topped the team standings, finishing 44.5 points ahead of Texas. It was the Golden Bears' fourth team national title.

Team standings
Note: Top 10 only
(DC) = Defending champions
Full results

See also
List of college swimming and diving teams

References

NCAA Division I Men's Swimming and Diving Championships
NCAA Division I Swimming And Diving Championships
NCAA Division I Men's Swimming And Diving Championships
NCAA Division I Men's Swimming and Diving Championships